The men's elite time trial at the 2021 European Road Championships will take place on 9 September 2021, in Trentino, Italy. Nations are allowed to enter a maximum of 2 riders into the event.

Results

References

Men's elite